B65 may refer to:
 HLA-B65, an HLA-B serotype
 B65 (New York City bus) in Brooklyn
 Sicilian, Richter-Rauzer, Encyclopaedia of Chess Openings code
 Bundesstraße 65, a German road

B-65 may refer to:
 B-65 Atlas, an American missile
 Design B-65 cruiser, a planned class of ships for Japan in World War II